The Oxnard strike of 1903 was a labor rights dispute in the southern California coastal city of Oxnard between local landowners and the majority Japanese and Mexican labor force.

History

Before the strike
 
In 1887, Henry, James, Benjamin, and Robert Oxnard sold their Brooklyn sugar refinery and moved to California to capitalize on the growing agricultural economy of the late nineteenth century. In 1897, following the enactment of the Dingley Tariff Bill that heavily taxed foreign sugar, Henry, James, and Robert Oxnard formed the American Beet Sugar Company. Although the seasonal Chinese and Mexican laborers already in place in the county easily satisfied agricultural labor needs early in the factory's history, decline in Chinese populations due to Chinese Exclusion Acts and use of Mexican workers in other agricultural efforts led to an increase in Japanese worker recruitment. A group of 1,000 Japanese farm workers were recruited in 1900 by labor contractors. By 1902 nine major Japanese contractors saw to the seasonal needs in the area.

Since these contractors had already caused minor slowdowns and protests over wages, recently arrived bank owners and merchants organized an owner-interest oriented contracting company called the Western Agricultural Contracting Company (WACC). The WACC quickly replaced the Japanese contractors as principal contractors to the Oxnard Plain and even forced some of them to subcontract through the WACC. This process also adversely affected farmworkers as the WACC charged a fee for subcontracting beneath them. The WACC regularly refused to pay laborers in cash and instead compensated them with credit for company stores which often sold goods at unreasonably high prices. Making up more than 90 percent of the work force, the WACC had a near monopoly of the workers. The WACC comprised two distinct departments, one tasked with the oversight of Japanese laborers and labor contractors and another tasked with the oversight of Mexican laborers and labor contractors. Workers under both of these departments were displeased by the conduct of the WACC. As a result, a large group of Japanese farmworkers and labor contractors organized a meeting at the beginning of February 1903 where they discussed their outrage at the working conditions and low wages under the WACC.

The strike and the JMLA
On February 11, 1903, 500 Japanese and 200 Mexican laborers became the charter members of the Japanese-Mexican Labor Association (JMLA) joined together and formed their organization based on the grievances of the Oxnard laborers. Despite its status as a farmworker's labor union, the members of the JMLA were laborers working under contract, labor contractors, and temporary workers - many of whom were students from Japan. The JMLA is notable for being the first major agricultural union in California to unite agricultural workers of different minority groups. Overcoming obvious language barriers between the two constituent groups, they immediately elected Kosaburo Baba (president), Y. Yamaguchi (secretary of the Japanese branch), and J.M. Lizarras (secretary of the Mexican branch); Baba and Lizarras were both labor contractors and Yamaguchi has been recognized as a boarding student recruited from San Francisco. Their immediate concerns opposed the WACC on three conditions:

 they accused the WACC of artificially suppressing wages;
 they opposed the subcontracting system arguing that it forced workers to pay double commissions; and
 they called for the freedom to buy goods rather than be subjected to the inflated prices of the company store.

In order to remedy these issues, the JMLA membership ceased working through the WACC (essentially declaring a strike). The strike came at a serendipitously precarious time in the sugar beet season, the staple crop of Oxnard Plain agriculture, since the labor-intensive and yield-defining work of thinning the seedlings needed to be done within the scope of a few weeks. By refusing to work through the WACC during the thinning of sugar beet crops, the JMLA challenged the backbone of financial operations in the Oxnard Plain. Laborers who participated in the strike threatened the profits of the owners of the WACC, the American Beet Sugar Company, and the farm owners. Their actions were met with hostile responses from local newspapers and the leadership of the American Beet Sugar Company. Colonel Driffil, manager of the American Beet Sugar Company, formally declared the company's support for the WACC and threatened to drive those who participated in the strike "out of the country." Outside of their own membership and other local Mexican and Japanese residents, the JMLA found little support from the white community in Oxnard outside of a few opportunistic merchants who saw the strike as a chance to disrupt WACC operations.

By the first week in March, the JMLA recruited a membership larger than 1,200 workers (over 90% of the labor force of the county's beet industry). The JMLA's increased recruitment pulled the WACC's former contracted workers from it and essentially brought the sugar industry to a standstill. Along with the labor strike, the JMLA staged large demonstrations and marches in Oxnard, displaying the union's strength in numbers. During the second and third weeks of March, the WACC formed an alternative union known as the Independent Agricultural Labor Union (IALU) which intended to undercut the JMLA's efforts. The IALU worked with the WACC as a strikebreaking organization seeking to restore regular working conditions in the sugar beet fields rather than advocate for farmworkers' rights.

On March 23, 1903, the strike reached its turning point. During a confrontation between the JMLA and IALU strikebreakers in Oxnard's Chinatown shots were fired, wounding two Japanese and two Mexican members of the JMLA. Luis Vasquez, a Mexican member of the JMLA, was killed by the gunfire. Initial reports by local newspapers blamed the JMLA for the violence; however, a statement released by the JMLA in the following days asserted that union members were not armed at the confrontation, pointing out that no union members had been arrested. The sole arrest from the confrontation was that of Deputy Constable Charles Arnold for the murder of Luis Vasquez. A subsequent coroner's inquest to determine Arnold's role in the murder saw the testimonies of 50 witnesses, many of which contradicted one another with certain witnesses claiming they had observed Arnold firing at Vasquez and others claiming that Arnold had not even raised his gun at the confrontation. After a series of conflicting witness accounts, the county coroner requested that more Japanese witnesses speak at the inquest in the following days. However, the all-white male jury refused to continue the inquest as they had reached a verdict with the given evidence. The jury found Charles Arnold innocent in the murder of Luis Vasquez and he was cleared of all charges.

Despite the outcome of the coroner's inquest, the WACC continued their striking efforts, bringing organized laborers from outside of town as well as intercepting potential strikebreakers. The Ventura Free Press reported on an incident in which members of the JMLA confronted a group of strikebreakers headed to a local farm and successfully convinced them to join the union's cause.

After the deadly skirmish in Chinatown, JMLA representatives met with representatives of local farmers and the WACC to engage in negotiations. During the first two days of negotiations, the JMLA stated clearly that they would refuse to end the strike until the WACC ended their monopoly over Oxnard Plain sugar beet operations and allow workers to contract directly with local farmers. The strike reached an official end on March 30, 1903 after the WACC agreed to cancel all standing contracts with local sugar beet farmers and grant farmworkers the right to contract directly with local growers.

Aftermath 
Japanese and Mexican laborers, formerly pitted against each other, had unified to achieve their labor goals. With the WACC as their common enemy, Japanese and Mexican farmworkers recognized their primary struggle as an issue of class conflict. JMLA membership viewed Anglo, Mexican, and even Japanese contractors who worked in conjunction with the WACC as antagonists to their cause. The success JMLA achieved showed the effectiveness of a multi-racial labor front and showed that class and Asian and Mexican shared oppression could be the unifier in labor organizing. 

The racial dimensions of the JMLA victory against the WACC brought several issues to the attention of the mainstream American labor movement which traditionally refused to integrate minorities and agricultural workers into unions. While certain socialist groups and local factions of organized labor supported the organization of Japanese and Mexican farmworkers, the majority of AFL affiliates and leadership did not support the JMLA. This position was mostly based in anti-Asian attitudes and the traditional exclusion of farm laborers from AFL activities.

Following their victory against the WACC, the JMLA sought to charter as the Sugar Beet Farm Laborer's Union of Oxnard (SBFLU) under the American Federation of Labor (AFL). However, the JMLA withdrew their request to charter under the AFL after AFL president Samuel Gompers refused to recognize the membership of Asian laborers under the AFL.

See also

 Oxnard, California
 La Colonia Barrio

References

Bibliography
Almaguer, Tomás. "Racial Domination and Class Conflict in Capitalist Agriculture: The Oxnard Sugar Beet Workers' Strike of 1903." Labor History, vol. 25, no. 3 (Summer 1984). Reprinted in Cornford, Daniel A. (ed.) (1995), Working People of California, Berkeley and Los Angeles, CA: University of California Press, pp. 183–207.

Further reading
Barajas, Frank P.(2012) Curious Unions: Mexican American Workers and Resistance in Oxnard, California, 1998-1961. Lincoln: University of Nebraska Press.
Daniel, Cletus E. Bitter Harvest: a History of California Farmworkers, 1870-1941. Berkeley: University of California Press.
Daniels, Roger (1977). The Politics of Prejudice: the Anti-Japanese Movement in California and the Struggle for Japanese Exclusion.  Berkeley: University of California Press.
Fletcher, Bill Jr., and Fernando Gapasin (2008). Solidarity Divided: The Crisis in Organized Labor and a New Path Toward Social Justice. Berkeley: University of California Press, pp. 9–18.
Flores, John H. (2006). "Oxnard Strike, 1903." In Arnesen, Eric (ed.), Encyclopedia of U.S. Labor and Working-Class History, Volume 1. New York: Routledge, pp. 1051–52.
Ganz, Marshall (2009). Why David Sometimes Wins: Strategy, Leadership and the California Agricultural Movement.  New York: Oxford University Press.
Gompers, Samuel, and Herman Gutstadt (1902). Meat vs. Rice: American Manhood vs. Asiatic Coolieism: Which Shall Survive? American Federation of Labor.
Ichihashi, Yamato (1932). Japanese in the United States. Stanford: Stanford University Press, pp. 160–192.
Ichioka, Yuji (1988). The Issei: The World of the First Generation Japanese Immigrants, 1885-1924. New York: The Free Press.
Jamieson, Stuart Marshall (1946). Labor Unionism in American Agriculture. U.S. Dept of Labor, U.S. Govt. Print. Off., Washington; reprint, New York: Arno Press (1976), pp. 43–58.
Mapes, Kathleen (2009). Sweet Tyranny: Migrant Labor, Industrial Agriculture, and Imperial Politics. Champaign: University of Illinois Press.
Murray, John Jr. (1904). "A Foretaste of the Orient." The International Socialist Review, July 1903–June 1904, vol. IV, pp. 72–79.
Saxton, Alexander (1975). The Indispensable Enemy: Labor and the Anti-Chinese Movement in California. Berkeley: University of California Press.
Soto, Gary. "Sugar Beet Union, Sugar Beet Strike, 1903" A Simple Plan. San Francisco: Chronicle Books, 2007.
Street, Richard (2004). Beasts of the Field: A Narrative History of California Farmworkers, 1769-1913. Stanford: Stanford University Press, pp. 405–524.
Wroblewski, Matthew (2004). "Violence, Vice, and the Media : a Labor History of Oxnard, 1898-1913." San Diego State University Press.

External links
Farmworkers' Struggle Timeline

Agriculture and forestry labor disputes in the United States
Agriculture in California
Labor disputes in California
Agricultural labor in the United States
Labor-related violence in the United States
Japanese-American history
Mexican-American history
History of Ventura County, California
History of Oxnard, California
Economic history of California
American Federation of Labor
1903
1903 labor disputes and strikes
1903 in California